Fenton v Scotty's Car Sales Ltd [1968] NZLR 929 is a cited case in New Zealand regarding  the legality of illegal contracts that pre date the Illegal Contracts Act 1970.

Background
Fenton purchased a car from Scotty's Car Sales. The vehicle had no current warrant of fitness at the time of the sale, despite this being required under regulation 53 of the Traffic Regulations 1956.
Fenton later tried to have the sale set aside due to this breach.

Held
The court ruled that the object of the Traffic regulations was road safety, and not consumer protection, and accordingly ruled the contract enforceable.

Footnote: Just 3 years earlier in Berrett v Smith [1965] NZLR 460, ruled that a similar warrant of fitness case, the court declared was illegal, and so not legally enforceable.

References

High Court of New Zealand cases
New Zealand contract case law
1968 in case law
1968 in New Zealand law